The 1986 Arab Junior Athletics Championships was the second edition of the international athletics competition for under-20 athletes from Arab countries. It took place in Cairo, Egypt. A total of 38 athletics events were contested, 22 for men and 16 for women. Algeria, a regional power in the sport, did not send a team.

Tunisia topped the medal table with twelve gold medals, most of them from the women's section. Morocco and Saudi Arabia each won seven gold medals and were closely followed by Egypt, which took six. Four top world-level athletes emerged at this competition, all of them Moroccan. In the men's 5000 metres, Brahim Boutayeb beat his compatriot Khalid Skah to the title – both went on to win gold medals in the 10,000 metres at the Olympics. In the women's 3000 metres, Zahra Ouaziz was only third in Cairo but as a senior she won two medals at the World Championships in Athletics. Nezha Bidouane was the Arab junior women's champion in the 100 metres hurdles and the runner-up in the 400 metres hurdles and later was a two-time world champion in the latter event.

The most successful athlete was Tunisia's Selma Khardani, who won the women's 800, 1500 and 3000 m titles. She won senior honours at national level, but not internationally. Hanan Ahmed Khaled was the second most successful athlete at the competition, winning the shot put and discus throw events, and also a javelin throw bronze medal; she became one of Egypt's most successful sportswomen, with four gold medals at the African Championships in Athletics to her name.

Medal summary

Men

Women

Medal table

References

Arab Junior Athletics Championships
International athletics competitions hosted by Egypt
Sports competitions in Cairo
Arab Junior Athletics Championships
Arab Junior Athletics Championships
1980s in Cairo
1986 in youth sport
Athletics in Cairo